Renovatio imperii Romanorum ("renewal of the empire of the Romans") was a formula declaring an intention to restore or revive the Roman Empire. The formula (and variations) was used by several emperors of the Carolingian and Ottonian dynasties, but the idea was common in Late Antiquity and the Middle Ages.

Late Antiquity
The phrases renovatio Romanorum ("renewal of the Romans") and renovatio urbis Romae ("renewal of the city of Rome") had already been used in Antiquity. The word renovatio ("renewal") and its relatives, resitutio ("restitution") and reparatio ("restoration"), occasionally appeared on Roman coins from the reign of Hadrian onward, usually signifying the restoration of peace following rebellion. The formula seems especially favoured by usurpers, such as Carausius, Magnentius and Decentius.

Even Theoderic the Great, the king of the Ostrogoths in Italy, made use of the language of Roman renewal. The records of his reign in Cassiodorus, Ennodius and the Anonymus Valesianus are replete with reference to renewing, repairing and rejuvenating.

Under the Emperor Justinian I, renewal was closely linked with the restoration of the empire's frontiers by reconquest. This policy appealed to the Roman aristocracy and to such writers as Procopius and John Lydus, who wrote in his De magistratibus: "To Rome Justinian restored what was Rome's." This was not enough for the poet Corippus, who saw the end of Justinian's reign as a period of reckless spending and neglect. His poem In Laudem Iustini Augusti Minoris takes as its theme the renewal of the empire under Justin II.

Middle Ages
The form renovatio Romanorum imperii was first used in a diploma issued by Charlemagne, who was crowned emperor in 800. He was probably inspired, at least in part, by Roman coins. Evidence for the "renewal" of the city of Rome under Charlemagne comes largely from the Liber pontificalis. There were major building and renovation programmes under Popes Hadrian I and Leo III, and there is also evidence for population growth and an increase in Christian pilgrimage traffic. Charlemagne's successor, Louis the Pious, dropped the formula in favour of a new one: renovatio regni Francorum ("renewal of the kingdom of the Franks"). When Louis's younger son, Charles the Bald, became emperor in 875 he adopted the combined formula renovatio imperii Romani et Francorum for his seal.

The formula renovatio imperii Romanorum reappears on a lead seal of the Emperor Otto III in August 998. This seal was replaced in January 1001 by one bearing the legend aurea Roma ("golden Rome"). Otto III also built a palace in Rome, which none of his predecessors had done. Otto III's use of the formula has been made to bear much historical weight in light of his enigmatic career and politics. The historian Percy Ernst Schramm argued that the formula represented a coherent programme for the restoration of the Roman Empire along secular and universal lines. Knut Görich has written a riposte to Schramm's thesis, arguing instead that Otto III and Pope Gregory V were embarking on a renewal of the papacy only.

The idea of the renewal of Rome the city (renovatio Romae), of the empire (renovatio imperii) and of Roman virtue (renovatio morum) were intertwined in early Italian humanist thinking. The Roman popular leader Cola di Rienzo believed that the renewal of the empire would be brought about through popular sovereignty and not the Holy Roman Emperors. Most humanists, like Dante and Petrarch, believed that the renewal of imperial authority in Italy would precede the renewal of the city and encouraged Kings Henry VII and Charles IV to make the journey to Rome for imperial coronation.

Notes

Bibliography

Latin mottos
Roman Empire
Carolingian Empire
Holy Roman Empire
Charlemagne